Ajibade Kunde Babalade (29 March 1972 – 4 September 2020) was a Nigerian footballer who played as a defender and was Team Chef of Shooting Stars FC.

Babalade died on 4 September 2020, aged 48.

Club career 
He played for FC Seoul of the South Korean K-League, then known as Anyang LG Cheetahs.

Coaching career 
On 17 October 2008 he was named as manager of the Shooting Stars F.C.

References

External links 
 

1972 births
2020 deaths
Nigerian footballers
Nigeria international footballers
Nigerian football managers
Nigerian expatriate footballers
Association football defenders
Austrian Football Bundesliga players
FC Seoul players
SK Sturm Graz players
Shooting Stars S.C. players
Africa Sports d'Abidjan players
Expatriate footballers in South Korea
Expatriate footballers in Austria
Expatriate footballers in Ivory Coast
Nigerian expatriate sportspeople in Ivory Coast
Heartland F.C. players
Nigerian expatriate sportspeople in South Korea
Yoruba sportspeople
Shooting Stars S.C. managers